Pressure Point is a 2001 Canadian–American action thriller film, starring Michael Madsen. It was directed by Eric Weston.

Plot
A father suspected of murder must fight to save his family from a ruthless killer.

Cast
 Michael Madsen as Jed Griffen
 Victoria Snow as Haley Griffen
 Ricky Mabe as Shane Griffen
 Samantha E. Cutler as Tiffany Griffen
 Jeff Wincott as Rudy Wicker

Reception
Matt Poirier from the blog "Direct to Video Connoisseur" praised Wincott and Madsen performances, but concluded: "You've seen this before, and while it has some good performances, it doesn't bring much new to the table and has dead moments that hurt things. Sometimes Wincott and Madsen are enough, sometimes they aren't."

References

External links
 
 
 
 Pressure Point at Moviefone
 Pressure Point at BFI

2001 films
American action thriller films
Canadian action thriller films
English-language Canadian films
Films directed by Eric Weston
2000s American films
2000s Canadian films